The 2010 Champs Sports Bowl was a college football bowl game that was played on December 28, 2010.  The game matched up the West Virginia Mountaineers from the Big East Conference versus the NC State Wolfpack from the Atlantic Coast Conference. The game was scheduled for a 6:30 p.m. ET kickoff at Florida Citrus Bowl Stadium in Orlando, Florida.

Background
West Virginia entered the game with a 9-3 record along with being co-champions of the Big East Conference.  The Mountaineers were hurt in their quest for the Big East's BCS bid with October losses to UConn and Syracuse.  WVU's strength was in their defense, which ranked 2nd nationally in points allowed and 3rd in yards allowed.  The Mountaineers have appeared in eight straight bowl games and were defeated in last year's Gator Bowl by Florida State 33-21.  West Virginia has played in the bowl on two previous occasions, in 1995 and 1997, when it was known as the Carquest Bowl and was played in Miami.

NC State entered the bowl with an overall record of 8-4.  The Wolfpack attempted to win a bowl game for the first time in coach Tom O’Brien’s four seasons in Raleigh. NC State played in the Papajohns.com Bowl in his second season but lost to Rutgers, 29-23.  The strength of the Wolfpack was in their passing game, ranked number 19 in the country.  NC State has appeared in the bowl three previous times, first in 1998 when the game was known as the MicornPC Bowl and was played in Miami, Florida, and then in 2001 and 2003 when it was played in Orlando but was called the Tangerine Bowl.

The two schools have played each other nine times previously, with WVU holding a 5-4 advantage, though they have not played since 1979.  This was the third time that they have played in a bowl game, having played in the 1972 and 1975 Peach Bowls. The bowl series between NC State and West Virginia is split, 1-1: the Wolfpack won the 1972 contest 49-13, and the Mountaineers won 13-10 in 1975.

Game Summary

Scoring

Statistics

References

Champs Sports Bowl
Cheez-It Bowl
West Virginia Mountaineers football bowl games
NC State Wolfpack football bowl games
American football in Orlando, Florida
Champs Sports Bowl
2010s in Orlando, Florida